Kagramanly is a village in the Beylagan Rayon of Azerbaijan.

References 

Populated places in Beylagan District